The Chegitun is a river located in the Chukotka Peninsula in Far East Siberia. It is the easternmost river flowing into the Chukchi Sea from the Siberian side, which makes it the easternmost significant river of the Eurasian continent.

The name of the river is based in the Eskimo–Aleut term Sahtuk, meaning 'straightened', which became Чегтун in the Chukchi language.

The waters of the river are an important spawning ground for Arctic char, Taranets char, Siberian salmon, Pink salmon, Chum salmon, Sockeye salmon and Dolly Varden trout are common in its waters.

Geography
The Chegitun flows in a roughly northeastern direction and crosses the Arctic circle a few miles before it meets the sea in a 500 m wide estuary. Close to its mouth there is the small abandoned village of Chegitun; the villages of Inchoun and Uelen are located not far down the coast. The Chegitun is frozen from October to June.

This river and its basin belong to the Chukotka Autonomous Okrug administrative region of Russia. The lower part of the river is included in the Beringia National Park.

References

External links
 Image

Rivers of Chukotka Autonomous Okrug
Drainage basins of the Chukchi Sea